Samuel Herrera Chávez (born 17 September 1954) is a Mexican politician from the Party of the Democratic Revolution. From 2009 to 2012 he served as Deputy of the LXI Legislature of the Mexican Congress representing Zacatecas.

References

1954 births
Living people
Politicians from Zacatecas
Members of the Chamber of Deputies (Mexico)
Party of the Democratic Revolution politicians
21st-century Mexican politicians
Municipal presidents in Zacatecas
Members of the Congress of Zacatecas